Paige Greco  (born 19 February 1997) is an Australian Paralympic cyclist who won gold medals at the 2019 World Track Championships in C1-3 women's pursuit 2020 Tokyo Paralympics. She broke the World Record setting a new one of 3:52.283 in the 3000m individual pursuit at the Tokyo Paralympics.

Personal life
Greco has cerebral palsy which mainly affects the right side of her body. She has completed an Exercise Science Degree at the University of South Australia.

Cycling
Greco is classified as a C3 cyclist. Before turning to cycling, Greco was a promising track and field athlete. In 2018, Greco moved from Victoria to South Australian Sports Institute to be coached by Loz Shaw.

At the 2019 UCI Para-cycling Track World Championships in Apeldoorn, Netherlands, she won gold medals in the Women's 3 km Pursuit C3 and C3 500m Time Trial.  In qualifying for Women's 3 km Pursuit final, Greco's time of 4mins 0.206secs broke the existing world record by three seconds. In the 500m Time Trial C3, her time of 39.442secs smashed the previous mark by almost two seconds. She also won the silver medal in the Women's Scratch Race C3.

At the 2019 UCI Para-cycling Road World Championships, Emmen, Netherlands, she won the gold medal in the  Women's Time Trial C3 and fifth in the Women's Road Race C3.

At the 2020 UCI Para-cycling Track World Championships, Milton, Ontario, she won the gold medal in the Women's Individual Pursuit C3.

Greco in her first Paralympic Games in 2020 Tokyo, won the Women's 3000m Individual Pursuit C1-3, setting a world record time of 3:50.815 in the gold medal race. She won bronze medals in the Women's Road Trial Trial C1-3 with a time of 26:37:54 and Women's Road Race C1-3 with a time of 1:13.11.

At the 2022 UCI Para-cycling Road World Championships in Baie-Comeau, she won the bronze medal in the Women's Time Trial C3 and finished 5th in the Women's Road Race C3.

At the 2022 UCI Para-cycling Track World Championships in  Saint-Quentin-en-Yvelines, France, she won the bronze medal in Women's Time Trial C3.

Recognition
2019 - Cycling Australia Para Female Track Cyclist of the Year.
2021 - South Australian Sports Institute Para Athlete of the Year 
2022 - Medal of the Order of Australia for service to sport as a gold medallist at the Tokyo Paralympic Games 2020

References

External links

Australian Cycling Team Profile

1997 births
Paralympic cyclists of Australia
Living people
Australian female cyclists
Cyclists from South Australia
Cerebral Palsy category Paralympic competitors
Cyclists at the 2020 Summer Paralympics
Medalists at the 2020 Summer Paralympics
Paralympic gold medalists for Australia
Paralympic bronze medalists for Australia
Recipients of the Medal of the Order of Australia
20th-century Australian women
21st-century Australian women